Nikki Brianne F. Samonte, better known as Nikki "Nikz" Samonte (born March 1, 2000) is a Filipina child actress, singer and model. She is currently handled and managed by ABS-CBN's talent agency, Star Magic.

Career

Filmography

Film

Television

Musical/International Shows

References

External links
 Official Twitter
 

2000 births
Living people
Filipino child actresses
Filipino child singers
Actresses from Nueva Ecija
Singers from Nueva Ecija
Pinoy Dream Academy participants
Star Magic
Filipino musical theatre actresses